Tapashi is a village in Belagavi district of Karnataka, India. Specialty of this village is river has been flowing from east to west !

References

Villages in Belagavi district